In 1950, the United States FBI, under Director J. Edgar Hoover, began to maintain a public list of the people it regarded as the Ten Most Wanted Fugitives.

The concept of the list began in late 1949, when the FBI helped publish an article about the "toughest guys" the Bureau was after, who remained fugitives from justice. The Washington Daily News article was titled, "FBI's Most Wanted Fugitives Named," and appeared on February 7, 1949. The  positive publicity from the story resulted in the birth of the FBI's "Ten Most Wanted Fugitives" list on March 14, 1950.

Starting in 1950, the top ten fugitives were entered into a handwritten log book. The Fugitive Publicity employees of the FBI used the log book to record and track the "Ten Most Wanted Fugitives" by this method until 1991.

1950 Fugitives
The Ten Most Wanted Fugitives listed by the FBI in 1950 include (in FBI list appearance sequence order):

By the end of the year, only three of the original Ten Fugitives still remained on the FBI list.

Later entries
FBI Ten Most Wanted Fugitives, 2020s
FBI Ten Most Wanted Fugitives, 2010s
FBI Ten Most Wanted Fugitives, 2000s
FBI Ten Most Wanted Fugitives, 1990s
FBI Ten Most Wanted Fugitives, 1980s
FBI Ten Most Wanted Fugitives, 1970s
FBI Ten Most Wanted Fugitives, 1960s
FBI Ten Most Wanted Fugitives, 1950s

References

External links
Current FBI top ten most wanted fugitives at FBI site
FBI pdf source document listing all Ten Most Wanted year by year (removed by FBI)

 
1950 in the United States